The Orleans Correctional Facility is a state prison in New York, United States.  OCF is a medium security prison for males and is located in the Town of Albion, Orleans County in Western New York.

It is located near the Albion Correctional Facility.

References

External links  
  NY prison information

Prisons in New York (state)
Albion, Orleans County, New York
Buildings and structures in Orleans County, New York